The Cincinnati–UCF football rivalry is an American college football rivalry between the University of Cincinnati Bearcats and University of Central Florida Knights. The rivalry dates to the first game between the teams in 2015.

The schools have played in the same conference since 2013 when both joined the American Athletic Conference, and will continue when both schools begin play in the Big 12 Conference in 2023.

History
In 2017, UCF was ranked No. 25th in the nation. McKenzie Milton blew up the Bearcats’ defense for 374 yards and five touchdowns through the first three quarters before torrential rain pounded Nippert Stadium, sending the teams to the locker room. The game was called after an hour and seven-minute delay and UCF was awarded the victory. 

In 2018, the Knights remained undefeated. UCF was ranked No. 11th overall in the Nation. National spotlight was on the game as the No. 19 Bearcats headed to Orlando for a prime time match up as ESPN College GameDay broadcast from UCF’s campus. UCF played in front of a sold-out crowd in the Bounce House. UCF went on to win 38–13, vaulting them to No. 8 in the nation and eventually winning the conference championship against Memphis.

Cincinnati quarterback Desmond Ridder, stated "That game not only set me up for the future but being able to lead everyone else on the team and know there's going to be tough environments and tough situations that we’re going to play in but to stay calm and stay under control is the biggest things in those moments."

In 2019, the Bearcats hung on for a 27–24 home victory against No. 18 UCF. This helped Cincinnati to a No. 17 ranking the following week.

In 2020, Cincinnati was now undefeated since 2020 Birmingham Bowl, ranking them 7th in the country. The Bearcats ultimately came from behind and won 36–33 against the Knights.

Game results

 Game ended after 3rd quarter due to weather

See also  
 List of NCAA college football rivalry games

References

College football rivalries in the United States
Cincinnati Bearcats football
UCF Knights football